The Opening Verse Stakes is an American Thoroughbred horse race held annually at Churchill Downs. A race on turf over a distance of one mile, it is open to horses of either sex age three and older. The race is named for Opening Verse, winner of the 1991 Breeders' Cup Mile at Churchill Downs, and was run as the Opening Verse Handicap from inception through 2008.

Historical notes
The inaugural running of the Opening Verse took place on June 12, 2004, and was won by Senor Swinger. Owned by prominent Californians Robert & Beverly Lewis and trained by U.S. Racing Hall of Fame inductee Bob Baffert, Senior Swinger returned to win the race for a second time on June 18, 2005.

In 2013 and again in 2020, weather conditions were such that for safety reasons the race was switched from the turf course to the dirt track.

Records
Speed record:
 1:34.10 @ 1 mile: Crafty Daddy (2020)
 1:40.41 @ 11/16 miles: Turallure (2011)

Most wins:
 Senor Swinger (2004, 2005)

Most wins by a jockey:
 2 - Corey Lanerie (2012, 2017)
 2 - Brian Hernandez Jr. (2016, 2020)

Most wins by a trainer:
 2 - Bob Baffert (2004, 2005)
 2 - Dale L. Romans (2012, 2013)
 2 - Steve Asmussen (2014, 2018)
 2 - Ian R. Wilkes (2016, 2018)

Most wins by an owner:
 2 - Robert & Beverly Lewis

Winners

References

Ungraded stakes races in the United States
Open mile category horse races
Churchill Downs horse races
June sporting events
Recurring sporting events established in 2004
2004 establishments in Kentucky